Scenes from Tebaldeo's Eclogues is a set of four small square oil on panel paintings by Andrea Previtali, executed between 1505 and 1510, now in the National Gallery, London. They show scenes from the Ferrarese writer Antonio Tebaldeo's eclogue on the life of Damon of Athens, featuring his friend Thyrsis and Damon's love for Amaryllis.
They were probably originally part of a piece of furniture for a rich Venetian noble family.  Previtali's master Giovanni Bellini also produced furniture with scenes from the same book.

Whilst still misattributed to Giorgione due to their pastoral content and style, they were acquired for their present owner in 1938 by its director Kenneth Clark at a high price, leading to the 'Giorgione Controversy'. However, comparison with the background landscape in Madonna and Child (Detroit Institute of Arts), an undated work signed by Previtali, confirmed that the four London works were in fact also by Previtali.

References

Paintings by Andrea Previtali
Collections of the National Gallery, London
1510 paintings